A prince regent or princess regent is a prince or princess who, due to their position in the line of succession, rules a monarchy as regent in the stead of a monarch regnant, e.g., as a result of the sovereign's incapacity (minority or illness) or absence (e.g., by remoteness, such as exile or long voyage, or the absence of an incumbent).

While the term itself can have the generic meaning and refer to any prince or princess who fills the role of regent, historically it has mainly been used to describe a small number of individual princes and princesses who were regents of non-principalities.

Prince regent in the United Kingdom

In the English language the title Prince Regent is most commonly associated with George IV, who held the style HRH The Prince Regent during the Regency era, the incapacity, by dint of mental illness, of his father, George III (see Regent for other regents). Regent's Park, Regent Street and Regent's Canal (which he commissioned) in London, were all named in honour of him. The architect John Nash, under the patronage of HRH The Prince Regent, planned a palatial summer residence for the prince, 50 detached villas in a parkland setting and elegant terraces around the exterior of the park. This was all part of an ambitious plan, to develop The Regent's Park and lay out an elegant new street, Regent's Street, to link it to St James's Park and the prince's London residence, Carlton House. Regent Terrace in Edinburgh is also named after the Prince Regent, who visited the area in 1822.

This period is known as the British Regency, or just the Regency.

The title was conferred by the Regency Act on 5 February 1811. Subject to certain limitations for a period, the prince regent was able to exercise the full powers of the King. The precedent of the Regency Crisis of 1788 (from which George III recovered before it was necessary to appoint a regent) was followed. The Prince of Wales continued as regent until his father's death in 1820, when he became George IV.

Prince regent in Germany
In Germany, the title Prinzregent (literally prince regent) is most commonly associated with Prince Luitpold of Bavaria, who served as regent for two of his nephews, King Ludwig II of Bavaria, who was declared mentally incompetent in 1886, and King Otto of Bavaria (who had been declared insane in 1875) from 1886 until 1912.

The years of Luitpold's regency were marked by tremendous artistic and cultural activity in Bavaria, where they are known after the regencies as the Prinzregentenjahre or the Prinzregentenzeit. Numerous streets in Bavarian cities and towns are called Prinzregentenstraße. Many institutions are named in Luitpold's honour, e.g., the Prinzregententheater in Munich. Prinzregententorte is a multi-layered cake with chocolate butter cream named in Luitpold's honour.

At Luitpold's death in 1912, his son Prince Ludwig succeeded as prince regent. Ludwig held the title for less than a year, since the Bavarian Legislature decided to recognise him as king.

Prince regent in Belgium
The first head of state of Belgium after it seceded from the Dutch monarchy in 1831 was a regent (but not a prince in his own right), baron Erasme Louis Surlet de Chokier, before the new nation, which had chosen to become a parliamentary monarchy, had its first king sworn into the constitution.
Prince Charles of Belgium served as prince regent of Belgium from 1944 to 1950 during the German captivity and exile to Switzerland of his elder brother, King Leopold III of Belgium.

Prince regent in Bulgaria

Kiril, Prince of Preslav was appointed head of a regency council by the Bulgarian parliament following the death of his brother, Tsar Boris III on 28 August 1943, to act as Head of State until the late Tsar's son and successor, Tsar Simeon II, reached the age of 18 years. On 5 September 1944 the Soviet Union declared war on the Kingdom of Bulgaria and on 8 September Soviet armies crossed the Romanian border and occupied the country. On 1 February 1945 the prince regent Kyril, and the two other former regents – Professor Bogdan Filov and General Nikola Mikhov – as well as a range of former cabinet ministers, royal advisors and 67 MPs, were executed.

Prince Lieutenant in Luxembourg
The heir-apparent or heir-presumptive to the grand duke of Luxembourg may be titled prince-lieutenant ('prince deputy') during a period in which the incumbent remains formally on the grand ducal throne, but (progressively, most) functions of the crown are performed by the 'monarch apprentice', as prince Jean did 4 May 1961 – 12 November 1964 in the last years of his mother Charlotte's reign until she abdicated and he succeeded to the grand ducal throne (she lived until 1985), and Jean's own son prince Henri 3 March 1998 – 7 October 2000 until his father abdicated and he succeeded (Jean lived until 2019).

Queen regent
If a king is unable to perform his duties then his consort or the queen mother may act for him as a Queen Regent. Queen mothers have acted in this way in the Kingdom of Eswatini.

Other notable princes and princesses regent
More prince-regents (often without such specific title) are to be found in List of regents.
Duke of Zhou Dan served as prince regent for his nephew King Cheng of Zhou until the latter came of age.
Philippe II, Duke of Orléans was Regent of France from the death of Louis XIV in 1715 until Louis XV came of age in 1723; this is also used as a period label for many aspects of French history, as "Régence" in French.   
Te Wherowhero Tawhiao, younger brother of Māori King Mahuta Tāwhiao, served as Whirinaki-a-te-Kiingi (Prince Regent) for his brother from 1903 to 1910. This was because Mahuta Tāwhiao spent this period of his reign as a member of the Legislative Council.   
Crown Prince Frederick of Denmark served as regent from 1784 to 1808 for his father, King Christian VII of Denmark, who was insane.
Prince William of Prussia served as regent from 1858 to 1861 for his older brother King Frederick William IV of Prussia, who had become mentally unfit to rule.
Prince Dorgon of the early Qing dynasty served as regent for his nephew, the Shunzhi Emperor, from 1643 to 1650, because the latter was only six at the time of his ascension. Dorgon was instrumental in moving Manchu forces into Beijing in 1644, proclaiming the Qing dynasty to be the legitimate successor to the Ming dynasty. In Qing dynasty historical records, Dorgon was the first to be referred to as Shezhengwang (摄政王; "Prince regent").
Rameses the Great
Prince Chun of the late Qing dynasty served as regent from 1908 to 1911 for his son Puyi, the Xuantong Emperor. Apart from Dorgon, Zaifeng was the only person in Chinese history who was specifically referred to as prince regent.
Crown Prince Hirohito served as regent from 1921 to 1926 for his ailing father, Emperor Taishō.
Prince Paul of Yugoslavia from 1934 to 1941, known in Serbian as Његово Краљевско Височанство, Кнез Намесник (English: His Royal Highness The Prince Regent) served as regent for his first cousin once removed, King Peter II who was a minor.
 John, Prince of Brazil (1767–1826) served as regent of Portugal for his mother Queen Maria I, who had become mentally unfit to rule, from 1799 to 1816.  His regency was associated with the transfer of the Portuguese court to Brazil.
Princess Erelu Kuti of Lagos, a Yoruba chieftess of the eighteenth century who served as queen mother of a line of tribal kings. The successors to the noble title that now shares her name have all subsequently served as regent of Lagos following the death of a reigning oba. Princesses are traditionally called upon to serve as regents in this fashion in most of the other kingdoms of Yorubaland as well. In Akure, for example, the eldest daughter of a recently deceased king ruled in his stead until a substantive successor to the royal title was chosen by the college of noble kingmakers, a period that lasted for an unusually long six years due to a succession crisis in the state.
Chief Tshekedi Khama of the Bamangwato, a Tswana prince who served as regent during the reign of his famous nephew, Sir Seretse Khama. He opposed Sir Seretse's marriage to Lady Khama on the grounds that it would have an adverse effect on the chieftaincy, and attempted to claim the tribal throne in his stead thereafter because of it. He was ultimately unsuccessful.
Anne of France served as regent of France for her younger brother between 1483-1491.
Sophia Alekseyevna from 1682-1689 as regent of Russia on behalf of her younger brothers.

References

External links
 

 
Regents
Royal titles